Vivekananda Institution is a high school in West Bengal, India. It is located in the Howrah district of West Bengal. The school was established in 1922 (the first school named after the great Indian sage Swami Vivekananda) and is inspired by his philosophy "Education is the manifestation of the perfection already in man". The school is a leading performer in the secondary and higher secondary exams of the state of West Bengal. The school is located at 75 & 77 Swami Vivekananda Road, Santragachhi, Howrah 711104, India.

Affiliations 
The school is affiliated to WBBSE (West Bengal Board of Secondary Education) for tenth Exam and WBCHSE (West Bengal Council of Higher Secondary Education) for 12th exam.

History 
The institution is named after the Hindu monk Swami Vivekananda and was established in 1923.

In 1928 the school was graced by the presence of Swami Shivananda. In 1956 the new main building was inaugurated by the then Governor of West Bengal Dr. Harendranath Mukhopadhaya.

The principal function of the school is to observe the ‘Swamiji Janmo Tithi’. The presidents of this function in the previous years were men like Ajit Kumar Ghosh, Swami Chidatmananda, Charuchandra Bhattacharya, Kumud Bandhu Sen, Pramathanath B. C., Mahendranath Sarkar,

Mrigendranath Mukhopadhyay was one of the founders of the institution. Two ex-Headmasters (Sudhangshu Sekhar Bhattacharya and Sri Brojamohan Majumder) were honoured by the government of India when they received the National Award for Teachers.

The institution has a roll strength of about two thousand students from class I to XII. The teaching and non-teaching staff range from 50 to 60.

Notable alumni
Jahar Das, former Indian football player  
Sankari Prasad Basu, writer 
Reetabrata Ghosh, Visual performer    
Swapan Sadhan Bose, industrialist  
Bholanath Chakraborty, Homeopath doctor  
Nemai Sadhan Bose, historian 
Samyo Bhaumik, Singer, Filmmaker, Writer

References 

Primary schools in West Bengal
High schools and secondary schools in West Bengal
Schools in Howrah district
Educational institutions established in 1922
1922 establishments in India